Kaniakapūpū ("the singing of the land shells"), known formerly as Luakaha ("place of relaxation"), is the ruins of the former summer palace of King Kamehameha III and Queen Kalama on the island of Oahu in Hawaii. Built in the 1840s, and situated in the cool uplands of the Nuʻuanu Valley, it served as the king and queen's summer retreat after the capital of the Kingdom of Hawaii moved from Lahaina to Honolulu in 1845. It was famous for being the site of a grand luau attended by an estimated ten thousand guests during the 1847 Hawaiian Sovereignty Restoration Day celebration. The palace had fallen into ruins by 1874; no records exist about its condition in the intervening years. Rediscovered in the 1950s, the site was cleared and efforts were made to stabilize the ruins from further damage by the elements and invasive plant growth. The site remains officially off-limits to the public and trespassers are subjected to citations, although the site is not regularly monitored.

Name

Kaniakapūpū is the current and most commonly used name of the site and palace. It means "the singing of the land shells" in the Hawaiian language. The name refers to the kāhuli (Oʻahu tree snails) which were once abundant in the area and, according to Hawaiian folklore, able to vocalize and sing sweet songs at night. Archaeologist Susan A. Lebo and anthropologist James M. Bayman, writing in 2001, claim that the name is a modern misnomer, possibly originating in the early 20th century. Moʻolelo (oral accounts) from this period associate the name with the remnants of a stone structure to the southeast of the house, believed to be a heiau (temple) dedicated to Lono, the Hawaiian god of fertility and healing. Tradition states that the king may have chosen to build his house on the heiau because of the mana (spiritual power) associated with the area. The contemporaneous Hale Aliʻi (ʻIolani Palace) was built on the site of a heiau called Kaʻahaimauli.

According to Lebo and Bayman, the actual region of Kaniakapūpū and Kaniakapūpū Heiau (also called Kawaluna Heiau) was located in the Waolani area of Oahu; contemporary records do not mention a heiau onsite or the king building his house on top of one. Kawaluna Heiau was associated with Kūaliʻi, the 16th-century aliʻi nui of Oahu, who asserted his control of the Kona district (the area encompassing much of modern Honolulu) after a ceremony at the temple. One of the earliest references to Kaniakapūpū and its association with Kawaluna Heiau was in the "Legend of Kamaakamahiai", published on August 13, 1870, in the Hawaiian-language newspaper Kuokoa. It stated: "...where the house of our King now stands. Kawaluna was its name in the old days and Kaniakapūpū is its name today".

Luakaha ("place of relaxation") was the name of the property during the king's lifetime, and originates from the name of the traditional ʻili kū (land division) of the ahupuaʻa of Honolulu, which encompassed a third of the forested upper slopes of Nuʻuanu Valley. There are no records of the house itself having any specific name, though when it was in use it was referred to as "the king's house, cottage, or retreat in Luakaha or Nuʻuanu". Luakaha was one of the many strategic grounds occupied by King Kalanikūpule during King Kamehameha I's invasion of the island of Oahu in 1795. Traditions state that Kamehameha rested his troops near the site during this campaign, which culminated in the decisive Battle of Nuʻuanu in which many of the defeated Oahu warriors were pushed off the Nuʻuanu Pali to their deaths.

History

In the early 19th century, Honolulu was situated on a dust plain. The aridity and lack of water, save for the Nuʻuanu Stream, prompted many residents to seek reprieve a few miles outside of town in the forested uplands of the Nuʻuanu Valley. In this suburb, American missionaries, white merchants, and the Hawaiian royals built European-style homes to escape the summer heat. The site of Luakaha was located  outside the city and was reachable by horse and carriage. The claim on the area was relinquished by Charles Kanaʻina during the Great Māhele of 1848, and it became a part of the Crown Lands. Kamehameha III also allocated a nearby piece of land to his advisor and friend Keoni Ana, who built Hānaiakamalama to be near the king.

Kaniakapūpū was built prior to the capital of the Kingdom of Hawaii moving to Honolulu from Lahaina in 1845. Along with Hale Aliʻi, the king's new official residence in the center of town, and a summer retreat in the Nuʻuanu Valley, the new royal residences were built to resemble the spatial-cultural geography of Mokuʻula, the king's royal residential complex in Lahaina. On July 5, 1842, American missionary Amos Starr Cooke, the teacher of Royal School, wrote in his journal that Governor Kekūanāoʻa was in the process of building a "stone house" for the king in Luakaha.

The retreat was completed in 1845 and became a place for entertaining foreign celebrities, chiefs, and commoners. On Hawaiian Sovereignty Restoration Day (Lā Hoʻihoʻi Ea) in 1847, King Kamehameha III and Queen Kalama hosted a grand luau at the palace. The celebration commemorated the fourth anniversary of the restoration of Hawaiian independence and sovereignty by British Rear-Admiral Richard Darton Thomas, following a five-month British occupation of the kingdom during the Paulet Affair of 1843. The luau was attended by an estimated ten thousand guests. The palace may also have been the site of an earlier luau, or great ahaʻaina (feast), which was part of the initial ten-day restoration festivities in 1842. Children from the Royal School, including all of the future Hawaiian monarchs, often visited with their teachers (the Cookes).

By 1874, a map of the region labeled the area as the "Old Ruins", implying a dilapidated state. No records exist as to why the site was abandoned.

Contemporary descriptions
Danish explorer Steen Anderson Bille visited Oahu in October 1846 while circumnavigating the globe on the corvette Galathea between 1845 and 1847. Besides having an audience with King Kamehameha III at Hale Aliʻi, and commenting on Honolulu social life, Bille wrote a description of Luakaha:

Another account was written in 1908 by Gorham D. Gilman, a New England merchant who resided in Lahaina and Honolulu from 1840 to 1861:

Modern conservation

The area was rediscovered in the 1950s, and the Territorial Commission on Historic Sites cleared and stabilized the ruins onsite. However, the site deteriorated over the next 30 years due to a lack of maintenance. A fund was created by the Historic Hawaii Foundation in 1998 to pay for preservation work on the ruins, which was completed two years later. An archaeological survey was also conducted around this time. Today, the site is managed by the State Historic Preservation Division of Hawaii's Department of Land and Natural Resources (DLNR) with the help of the Historic Hawaii Foundation and other local preservation organizations, including the Aha Hui Malama O Kaniakapūpū. Kaniakapūpū was added as site 66000293 to the National Register of Historic Places on October 15, 1966.

Kaniakapūpū is located at the end of an unmarked trail off the Pali Highway. The property is near the Luakaha Falls, and the surrounding area and trail leading up to the site are covered by a forest of invasive bamboo. Periodic clearing is necessary in order to halt the deteriorating effects of invasive root growth. The trail and ruins, which are located in a protected watershed, are officially off-limits to the public, although state DLNR officials do not regularly monitor the site. Trespassers are subjected to citations if caught.

Vandalism
In 2016, Kaniakapūpū was damaged by vandals who scratched crosses into the historic stone walls. Previously, tourists had etched initials and other markings, while others often leaned, sat, or climbed on the walls for photo shoots. These actions further degraded the ancient structure. State DLNR officials and volunteers denounced these acts as "utter disrespect" for the cultural importance of the site.

Social media was blamed for bringing unwanted visitors to the site and not pointing out that the area is off-limits to the public. Following these acts of vandalism, the state of Hawaii asked for the removal of directions to Kaniakapūpū on many social media websites and tourism blogs, and encouraged those who knew the direction to the ruins to come with respect.

Plaque

A plaque was erected at Kaniakapūpū by the Commission on Historical Sites, which reads:

See also

 Hānaiakamalama, the summer palace of Queen Emma and King Kamehameha IV

References

Bibliography

External links 

Royal residences in Hawaii
Hawaiian architecture
Houses on the National Register of Historic Places in Hawaii
History of Oahu
Houses in Honolulu County, Hawaii
Ruins in the United States
National Register of Historic Places in Honolulu County, Hawaii